The short-tailed weasel is the common name in North America for two species of mustelid, both of which were formerly considered a single species.

 Stoat or Beringian ermine, Mustela erminea, found in Alaska, Arctic Canada, and Greenland, along with a wider range in Eurasia.
 American ermine, Mustela richardsonii, found throughout most of North America aside from the aforementioned places.

Animal common name disambiguation pages